Le Marteau sans maître (The Hammer without a Master) is a chamber cantata by French composer Pierre Boulez. The work, which received its premiere in 1955, sets surrealist poetry by René Char for contralto and six instrumentalists. It is among his most acclaimed compositions.

History 

Before Le Marteau, Boulez had established a reputation as the composer of modernist and serialist works such as Structures I, Polyphonie X, as well as his infamously "unplayable" Second Piano Sonata. Le Marteau was first written as a six-movement composition between 1953 and 1954, and was published in that form in the latter year, "imprimée pour le festival de musique, 1954, Donaueschingen" (though in the end it was not performed there) in a photographic reproduction of the composer's manuscript by Universal Edition, given the catalog number UE 12362.

In 1955 Boulez revised the order of these movements and interpolated three newly composed ones. The original, six-movement form lacked the two "Bel Édifice" settings and the third commentaire on "Bourreaux de solitude". In addition, the movements were grouped in two closed cycles: first the three "Artisanat furieux" movements, then the three "Bourreaux de solitude" ones, otherwise in the order of the final score. The first movement, though fundamentally the same composition, was originally scored as a duet for vibraphone and guitar—the flute and viola were added only in the revision—and numerous less significant alterations were made to playing techniques and notation in the other movements.

It received its première in 1955 at the 29th Festival of the International Society for Contemporary Music in Baden-Baden. Boulez's work was chosen to represent France at this festival. The French members of the committee were against this, but Heinrich Strobel, then director of the Baden-Baden Südwestfunk Orchestra, which was scheduled to give all of the concerts at the festival, threatened to withdraw the orchestra if the work was not accepted. The first performance was given on 18 June 1955 conducted by Hans Rosbaud, with Sybilla Plate as the solo singer.

Boulez, notorious for considering his works to be always "in progress", made further, smaller revisions to Le Marteau in 1957, in which year Universal Edition issued an engraved score, UE 12450. In the years that have followed, it has become Pierre Boulez's most famous and influential work.

Movements

The work has nine movements, four of which set the text of three poems of René Char. The remaining movements are instrumental extrapolations of the other four:

These movements are grouped into three cycles by Boulez. The first cycle consists of movements I, III, and VII. The second cycle is movements II, IV, VI, and VIII. Movements V and IX make up the third cycle.

Composition 

Steven Winick writes:

Despite having been published in 1954 and 1957, analysts were unable to explain Boulez's compositional methods until Lev Koblyakov in 1977. This is partially due to the fact that Boulez believes in strict control tempered with "local indiscipline", or rather, the freedom to choose small, individual elements while still adhering to an overall structure compatible with serialist principles. Boulez opts to change individual notes based on sound or harmony, choosing to abandon adherence to the structure dictated by strict serialism, making the detailed serial organization of the piece difficult for the listener to discern.

Orchestration 

The instrumentation was quite novel for Western music at the time, lacking any kind of bass instrument, and drew some influence from the sound of non-Western instruments. The xylorimba recalls the African balafon; the vibraphone, the Balinese gamelan; and the guitar, the Japanese koto, though "neither the style nor the actual use of these instruments has any connection with these different musical civilizations". Boulez chose the collection with a continuum of sonorities in mind: "a number of features shared by these instruments (forms) a continuous passage from voice to vibraphone". The purpose is to allow a graduated deconstruction of the voice into percussive noises, a compositional technique which has been common throughout Boulez's work (e.g. Sur Incises of 1998 similarly breaks down the sounds of the piano by combining it with harp and percussion). The voice and five pitched instruments can be arranged in a line, each pair connected by a similarity, as in the following diagram:

The vocal writing is challenging for the singer, containing wide leaps, glissandi, humming (notated bouche fermée in the score), and even Sprechstimme, a device found in the work of the Second Viennese School before Boulez. There are also deliberate similarities to Arnold Schoenberg's song cycle, Pierrot Lunaire, one of which is that each movement chooses a different subset of the available instruments:

The opening of the third movement in the flute is typical of the difficulties required of performers including wide range, large leaps, and complex rhythms:

First cycle: "L'Artisanat furieux" 

Boulez uses many serial composition techniques, including pitch multiplication and pitch-class association. According to Koblyakov, Movements I, III, and VII, are based on multiplying together various sets derived from the following tone row: . However, Mosch argues that this is not the basic form, but rather the "série renversée" (inversion) of the basic row.

Boulez groups these notes into five sets according to five different rotations on the pattern 2–4–2–1–3, reflecting the highly mathematical nature in which this piece is composed. Following the first rotation of this pattern, the row would be grouped as 3 5 – 2 1 10 11 – 9 0 – 8 – 4 7 6. Using the five possible rotations of this pattern, Boulez creates five rows of five groupings each:

{| class="wikitable"
|-
! !! a !! b !! c !! d !! e
|-
! I 
| 3 5 
| 2 1 10 11 || 9 0 || 8 || 4 7 6
|-
! II 
| 3 5 2 1 || 10 11 || 9 || 0 8 4 || 7 6
|-
! III 
| 3 5 || 2 || 1 10 11 || 9 0 || 8 4 7 6
|-
! IV 
| 3 || 5 2 1 || 10 11 || 9 0 8 4 || 7 6
|-
! V 
| 3 5 2 || 1 10 || 11 9 0 8 || 4 7 || 6
|}

Using these 25 groups in conjunction with pitch multiplication, Boulez is able to create 25 "harmonic fields" within each set. Koblyakov in his analysis assigns a letter to each cluster within a set, such that two sets multiplied together can be notated as "aa", "bc", "ed", etc. Boulez's form of pitch multiplication can be thought of more as pitch addition. With this technique, Boulez takes two clusters and takes the sum of every possible pairing between the two clusters. For example, if we were to multiply groups b and c within set I, we would have the following:

(2 1 10 11) + (9 0) = ((2+9) (1+9) (10+9) (11+9) (2+0) (1+0) (10+0) (11+0)) = (11 10 7 8 2 1 10 11)

Boulez then eliminates any duplicate pitches, which in this case would leave us with the set . In fact, this is the set of notes we get in measure three of movement III, "L'Artisanat furieux." This movement, scored only for flute and voice, lays out pitch multiplication in a more straightforward way than movements I and VII. For the first 11 measures, Boulez (mostly) sticks to one pitch multiplication set per measure. Later, Boulez begins to use multiple pitch fields at a time, further complicating the analysis. Koblyakov's analysis reveals that the harmonic fields Boulez employs at certain parts of the piece are laid out very systematically, showing that the movements' overall forms are complexly mathematical as well.

Second cycle: "Bourreaux de solitude" 

The second cycle consists of movements II, IV, VI, and VIII. Through these movements, especially movement VI, Boulez uses a technique called "pitch-duration association" by Steven Winick. This technique associates individual pitches with individual durations, for example, C = sixteenth note, C = eighth note, D = dotted-eighth note, so that as the pitch increases by half step the associated duration increases by an added sixteenth note. Winick calls this a pitch-duration association or PDA based on C. In movement VI, these PDAs are most easily observed, with the first twelve notes of the piece forming a PDA on D. The next twelve notes also fall neatly into a PDA on G, though Boulez occasionally swaps the durations of a couple pitches throughout this system, reflecting his interest in "local indiscipline." Another way in which Boulez confuses the analysis of this cycle is by placing some rhythms under triplet markings. After the voice enters in measure 13 of the movement, matters become even more complicated as Boulez employs all 12 possible PDAs simultaneously throughout the rest of the movement. As with the first cycle, Boulez's overall formal structure is quite complex and shows many patterns. Arrangements in pitch order throughout these PDAs reveals many symmetrical and palindromic arrangements, which are further explored both in Winick's and Koblyakov's analyses.

In addition to coordinating durations with certain pitches, Boulez assigns dynamics and attacks to pitches in a similar manner. Using the opening PDA on D as an example, Boulez arranges the pitches chromatically and then groups them into 6 pairs (D and D, E and F, F and G, etc.), assigning a dynamic from pianissimo to fortissimo to each pair. In addition, the first note within a pair receives an attack of some sort—legato for piano and pianissimo, accent for mezzo forte and mezzo piano, and sforzando for forte and fortissimo. However, while these dynamic and attack associations are consistent enough to be unmistakably deliberate, Boulez returns again to the idea of "local indiscipline". Wentzel found that Boulez's association of pitches, dynamics, durations, and attacks agrees with his analysis 80% of the time. A number of these discrepancies are accounted for by differences among the printed and manuscript sources, but it is impossible to say whether any are deliberate compositional decisions.

Third cycle: "Bel Édifice et les pressentiments" 

The third cycle consists only of movements V and IX, making it the shortest of the three cycles. However, both of these movements play essential roles in the piece, especially when one takes into account the extreme levels of symmetry and pattern employed by Boulez in his composition of the work. Movement V occupies the central position in Le marteau, and the movement itself may be broken up into six sections. Boulez designates these sections in his tempo markings and orchestrations—the three odd-numbered sections are written only for instruments and marked assez vif, while the three even-numbered sections are scored for voice and instruments and marked plus large. An interesting characteristic of Boulez's orchestrating during the even sections is that the voice and instruments seem to be in opposition, with the instruments playing similar rhythms and dynamics (or at least more similar than between the instruments and the voice). In the sections where the voice is not present, the writing for the instruments is more contrapuntal. Movement V also uses Sprechgesang while vocal parts in the other cycles do not.

Movement IX is broken up into three large sections, with the third being broken up further into a number of smaller fragments. The first large section includes variations of quotations from the central movements of all three cycles (movements III, V, and VI) along with the text from movement 5. The movements are quoted in reverse order (i.e. VI, V, III), and each time the text from the quoted movement is combined in some way with the text from movement III. The second large section, also the main section of the movement, includes a voice part without text and is built on a similar set of PDAs as the second cycle of Marteau while also drawing on movement V. The harmony for this section is interesting in that Boulez entirely avoids minor seconds as well as minor thirds (though their inverse, major sixths, are used instead). Unisons are used very rarely. The third section of movement IX serves as both a coda to the movement and to the piece. It is scored only for flute and percussion.

Another interesting characteristic of movement IX is that all of its tempos are drawn from previous movements. Tempo shifts also almost always increase by a ratio of 1.2 or 1.5.

Text 

The text for this work was taken from René Char's collection of poems, Le Marteau sans maître, written in the 1930s while Char "still shared the surrealist views of poets like André Breton and Henri Michaux". Boulez had earlier written two cantatas, Le Visage nuptial and Le Soleil des eaux in 1946 and 1948, which also set poems by René Char.

Reception and legacy
Le Marteau sans maître was hailed by critics, fellow composers, and other musical experts as a masterpiece of the post-war avant-garde from its first performance in 1955. Interviewed in 2014, the composer Harrison Birtwistle declared that Le Marteau sans maître "is the kind of piece, in all the noise of contemporary music that's gone on in my lifetime, I'd like to have written". Another British composer, George Benjamin, described the work as "a breakthrough. It is a work in which you can also hear the profound influence of extra-European music, above all from Asia and Africa. This radically alters the sonority and the music's sense of time and direction, as well as its expressive viewpoint and ethos". One of the most enthusiastic and influential early testimonials came from Igor Stravinsky, who praised the work as an exemplar of "a new and wonderfully supple kind of music".

However, according to Howard Goodall, the sixty years since its première have failed to grant Le marteau an equally enthusiastic endorsement from the general public. "While Boulez's iconoclasm was attractive to some students of twentieth-century classical music, who venerated… Le marteau sans maître,… most neutral listeners then as now found both his polemic and his music thoroughly impenetrable". Despite its attractive surface, its "smooth sheen of pretty sounds", issues remain about the music's deeper comprehensibility for the ordinary listener. Even Stravinsky's ear struggled to hear some of the work's polyphonic textures: "One follows the line of only a single instrument and is content to be 'aware of' the others. Perhaps later the second line and the third will be familiar, but one mustn't try to hear them in the tonal-harmonic sense". But if we are supposed not to listen in the tonal-harmonic sense, what exactly is it that we should hear and understand in a work which, in the words of Alex Ross, features "nothing so vulgar as a melody or a steady beat"? Stravinsky said that repeated hearings, through the availability of recordings, would aid performers more quickly to overcome technical difficulties presented by the music: "If a work like Le marteau sans maître had been written before the present era of recording it would have reached young musicians outside of the principal cities only years later. As it is this same Marteau, considered so difficult to perform a few years ago, is now within the technique of many players, thanks to their being taught by record".

Writing some 40 years since Le Marteau first appeared, composer and music psychologist Fred Lerdahl criticized Koblyakov's approach to analyzing Le Marteau:  Lerdahl cautions, however, that "There is no obvious relationship between the comprehensibility of a piece and its value". While considering "complicatedness to be a neutral value and complexity to be a positive one", and therefore that only musical surfaces leading to complexity employ "the full potential of our cognitive resources", many kinds of music satisfy such criteria (e.g., Indian raga, Japanese koto, jazz, and most Western art music), while other types "fall short": Balinese gamelan because of its "primitive pitch space" and rock music on grounds of "insufficient complexity", while much contemporary music (without specific reference to Boulez) "pursues complicatedness as compensation for a lack of complexity".

Roger Scruton finds Boulez's preoccupation with timbre and sonority in the instrumental writing has the effect of preventing "simultaneities from coalescing as chords". As a result, Scruton says that, especially where pitches are concerned, Le Marteau "contains no recognizable material – no units of significance that can live outside the work that produces them". Scruton also feels that the involved overlapping metres notated in the score beg "a real question as to whether we hear the result as a rhythm at all". Richard Taruskin found "Le Marteau exemplified the lack of concern on the part of modernist composers for the comprehensibility of their music". Equally bluntly, Christopher Small, writing in 1987 said "It is not possible to invoke any 'inevitable time lag' which is supposed to be required for the assimilation of ...such critically acclaimed works as... Le marteau sans maître... Those who champion 'the new music' await its assimilation into the repertory much as the early Christians awaited the Second Coming".

References 

Sources

 
 
 
 
 
 
 
 
 
 
 
 {{wikicite|ref=|reference=Mosch, Ulrich. 2004. Musikalisches Hören serieller Musik: Untersuchungen am Beispiel von Pierre Boulez' 'Le Marteau sans maître'''. Saarbrücken: Pfau-Verlag. .}}
 
 
 
 
 
 
 
 
 
 
 
 
 
 

 Further reading 

 Aguila, Jésus. 2001. "Boulez: Vingt regards sur une page du Marteau sans maître". Analyse Musicale, no. 41 (4th quarter) 77–94. .
 Andersen, Mogens. 2001. "På sporet af hammerens herre: Om 'studiekredsen' og Le Marteau sans maître". In Fluktuationer: Festskrift til Ib Nørholm på 70-års dagen 24. januar 2001, edited by Eva Hvidt, Mogens Andersen, and Per Erland Rasmussen, 15–29. Frederiksberg: MAmusik. .
 Bacht, Nikolaus. 2001. "'L'Artisanat furieux' und sein Modell: Vergleichende Analyse von Arnold Schönbergs 'Der kranke Mond' aus Pierrot lunaire und Pierre Boulez' 'L'Artisanat furieux' aus Le marteau sans maître". Die Musikforschung 54, no. 2:153–164.
 Boesche, Thomas. 1990. "Einige Beobachtungen zu Technik und Ästhetik des Komponierens in Pierre Boulez' Marteau sans Maître", Musiktheorie 5, no. 3:253–270.
 Boulez, Pierre. 1957. Le Marteau sans maître, score. London: Universal Edition.
 Boulez, Pierre. 1971. Boulez on Music Today. Translated by Susan Bradshaw and Richard Rodney Bennett. Cambridge, Massachusetts: Harvard University Press. .
 Boulez, Pierre. 1991. Stocktakings from an Apprenticeship. Translation by Stephen Walsh. Oxford: Clarendon Press; New York: Oxford University Press. .
 Boulez, Pierre. 2005. Le Marteau sans maître. Facsimile of the draft score and the first fair copy of the score, with an introduction in French and English. Veröffentlichungen der Paul Sacher Stiftung. Edited by Pascal Decroupet. Mainz: Schott. .
 Decarsin, François. 1998. "L'organisation du temps en musique sur l'axe passé/futur". In Les universaux en musique: Actes du quatrième congrès international sur la signification musicale, edited by Costin Miereanu, Xavier Hascher, and Michel Guiomar, 589–597. Serie Esthétique. Paris: Publications de la Sorbonne. .
 Decroupet, Pascal. 2012. "Le rôle des clés et algorithmes dans le décryptage analytique: L'exemple des musiques sérielles de Pierre Boulez, Karlheinz Stockhausen et Bernd Alois Zimmermann". Revue de Musicologie 98, no. 1:221–246.
 Decroupet, Pascal, and Jean-Louis Leleu. 2006. "'Penser sensiblement' la musique: Production et description du matériau harmonique dans le troisième mouvement du Marteau sans maître". In Pierre Boulez: Techniques d'écriture et enjeux esthétiques, edited by Pascal Decroupet and Jean-Louis Leleu, 177–215. Geneva: Contrechamps. .
 Fink, Wolfgang G. 1997. " 'Schönes Gebäude und die Vorahnung': Zur Morphologie des 5. Satzes von Pierre Boulez' Le marteau sans maître". In Pierre Boulez II, Muzik-Konzepte 96, edited by Heinz-Klaus Metzger and Rainer Riehn, 3–61. Munich: Edition Text und Kritik.
 Fiore, Giacomo. 2015. "60 Years After its Debut, Pierre Boulez's Le Marteau Sans Maître Continues to Inspire and Challenge Guitarists". Classical Guitar (Summer). Reprinted, Classical Guitar website (6 January 2016).
 福岡由仁郎 [Fukuoka, Yujiro]. 2005.『ピエール・ブーレーズ論：セリー主義の美学』[Pierre Boulez: Aesthetics of Serialism]. Ph.D. diss. Tokyo: Tokyo University of Foreign Studies.
 Gligo, Nikša. 2009. "Skladba kao kritika skladbe: Le marteau sans maître (Čekić bez gospodara) vs. Pierrot lunaire—O nekim specifičnim funkcijama skladateljske teorije u glazbi 20. stoljeća". In Glazba prijelaza: Svečani zbornik za Evu Sedak/Music of Transition: Essays in Honour of Eva Sedak, edited by Nikša Gligo, Dalibor Davidović, and Nada Bezić, 110–118. Zagreb: ArTresor and Hrvatska Radiotelevizija. .
 Goldberg, Albert. 1957. "The Sounding Board: The Battle of Boulez: The Defense Rallies Its Forces and Launches a Strong Counterattack". Los Angeles Times (21 April): E5.
 Grout, Donald, and Claude Palisca. 2001. A History of Western Music, 6th edition. New York: W. W. Norton, p. 726. .
 Haas, Georg Friedrich. 1990. "Disziplin oder Indisziplin. Anmerkungen zu der von Ulrich Mosch veröffentlichten Reihentabelle von Pierre Boulez", Musiktheorie 5, no. 3:271–274.
 Heimerdinger, Julia. 2014. Sprechen über Neue Musik: Eine Analyse der Sekundärliteratur und Komponistenkommentare zu Pierre Boulez' Le Marteau sans maître (1954), Karlheinz Stockhausens Gesang der Jünglinge (1956) und György Ligetis Atmosphères (1961). Berlin: epubli GmbH. .
 Heinemann, Stephen. 1993. Pitch-Class Set Multiplication in Boulez's 'Le Marteau sans maître. D.M.A. diss., University of Washington.
 Hirsbrunner, Theo. 1974. "Die surrealistische Komponente in Pierre Boulez' Le Marteau sans maître". Neue Zeitschrift für Musik 124, no. 7:420–425.
 Hoffman, Michael. 1997. "Pierre Boulez's Le marteau sans maître: An Overview Analysis". 20th-Century Music 4, no. 10 (October): 4–11.
 Jameux, Dominique. 1991. Pierre Boulez. Cambridge, Massachusetts: Harvard University Press. . London: Faber. .
 Koblyakov, Lev. 1977. "P. Boulez Le Marteau sans maître: Analysis of Pitch Structure". Zeitschrift für Musiktheorie 8, no. 1:24–39.
 Koblyakov, Lev. 1981. The World of Harmony of Pierre Boulez: Analysis of 'Le Marteau sans maître. Ph.D. diss., Hebrew University of Jerusalem.
 Losada, Catherine C. 2014. "Complex Multiplication, Structure, and Process: Harmony and Form in Boulez's Structures II". Music Theory Spectrum 36, no. 1 (Spring): 86–120.
 Mosch, Ulrich. 1990. "Disziplin oder Indisziplin? Zum seriellen Komponieren im 2. Satz des Marteau sans maître". Musiktheorie 5, no. 1:39–66.
 Mosch, Ulrich. 1997. "Wahrnehmungsweisen serieller Musik." Musiktheorie 12:61–70.
 Piencikowski, Robert T. 1980. "René Char et Pierre Boulez: Esquisse analytique du Marteau sans maître". In Schweizer Beiträge zur Musikwissenchaft 4, edited by Jürg Stenzl, 193–264. Bern and Stuttgart: Haupt.
 Piencikowski, Robert T. 2000. "Pierre Boulez's Le Marteau sans maître". In Music History from Primary Sources: A Guide to the Moldenhauer Archives, edited by John Newsom and Alfred Mann, 134–141. Washington: Library of Congress.
 Piencikowski, Robert T. 2003. "Au fil des esquisses du Marteau". Mitteilungen der Paul Sacher Stiftung no. 16:12–17.
 Roberts, Gwyneth Margaret. 1968. Rhythm as a Structural Element in Boulez' 'Le Marteau sans maître. M.M. thesis. Bloomington: Indiana University.
 Roxburgh, Edwin. 2014. Conducting for a New Era. Woodbridge, Suffolk: Boydell & Brewer.  (accessed 14 October 2015).
 Ruwet, Nicolas. 1959. "Contradictions du langage sériel". Revue Belge de Musicologie 13 (1959), 83–97. English trans., as "Contradictions within the Serial Language". Die Reihe 6 (1964): 65–76.
 Souvtchinsky, Pierre. 1955. "Le Mot-fantôme: Le Marteau sans maître de Pierre Boulez et de René Char". Nouvelle Revue Française 3, no. 32:1107–1109.
 Souvtchinsky, Pierre. 1971. 2004. "Quatre Paragraphes: Pierre Boulez et René Char". In Cahier de l'Herne René Char, edited by Dominique Fourcade. Paris: Herne. Reprinted in Pierre Souvtchinsky, Un siècle de musique russe (1830–1930): Glinka, Moussorgsky, Tchaïkowsky et Autres écrits: Strawinsky, Berg, Messiaen et Boulez, edited by Frank Langlois, preface by Pierre Boulez, 265–276. Arles: Actes Sud, 2004. .
 Tsaregradskaya, Tatyana. 1997. "Pierre Boulez's Le Marteau sans Maitre: The Composition as a Process and a Result". In A Composition as a Problem'', edited by Mart Humal, 45–49. Tallinn: Eesti Muusikaakadeemia. .

Compositions by Pierre Boulez
20th-century classical music
Serial compositions
Chamber music compositions
Music based on poems
1955 compositions